World Party is the third studio album by the American hip hop group Goodie Mob. The album was the group's last album with the original four members until Age Against the Machine in 2013.  

The Album was certified gold By the RIAA in 2000 

Former NFL cornerback Asante Samuel has a tattoo on his left arm that says “Get Rich To This,” because he liked that song in college.

Track listing

Charts

Weekly charts

Year-end charts

References

1999 albums
Goodie Mob albums
LaFace Records albums
Albums produced by Easy Mo Bee
Albums produced by Kanye West
Albums produced by Organized Noize